The Made V.I.P Tour is the first Chinese fan meeting tour by South Korean boy band Big Bang, in support of their albums, M, A, D and E released in 2015. The tour attracted over 500,000 people in Mainland China alone, breaking BigBang's own record for the most attended tour by a foreign language act of all time in China. Their event in Luoyang, China attracted over 45,000 people broke their previous record for the largest audience drawn by a foreign language act of all time in China. BigBang was the highest earning act in Mainland China from concert revenue in 2016, surpassing local acts like Jay Chou and Eason Chan, by earning 70.3 million USD from 36 concerts, accounting for 70% of the total box office of South Korean acts in China.

Background
On February 6, 2016, YG Entertainment announced the first leg of the tour in Mainland China, with shows in Shanghai, Shenzhen, Zhengzhou, Hangzhou, Hefei, Changsha, Nanchang and Nanjing. In May 2016, the second leg was announced with the addition of eight more cities including Shenyang, Foshan, Nanning, Qingdao, Harbin, Dalian, Chongqing and Chengdu. Six additional shows at the end of May were announced in Hong Kong and Taiwan.

On June 12, two shows were announced for Guangzhou on July 7 and 8, and a third show was added after the first two shows sold-out. On June 16, tickets for the Hong Kong shows were put on sale. An overwhelming response followed with all tickets for three shows being sold out in under an hour, leading to a fourth show being added on July 24. At the end of June, a third show had been added in both Chongqing and Beijing, and a new show in Luoyang was announced.

On July 7, it was announced that the tour would visit Macau, with two shows at CotaiArena. The tickets for Taiwan went on sale on July 9. The ticketing website's system experienced heavy traffic causing an immediate crash, and ticket sales were postponed to a later date.

On August 12, it was announced that the fan meeting will expand to Honolulu, and marks the first time for the group to hold a fan meeting in America. On August 29 and 30, it was announced that the tour would visit Malaysia and Singapore on October 1 and 2.

The tour promoters announced that T.O.P would not be able to attend the shows in Taiwan, Malaysia and Singapore due to scheduling conflicts.

Set list
 "Loser"
 "Bang Bang Bang"
 "If You"
 "Bad Boy"
 "Strong Baby" (Seungri)
 "Look at Me, Gwisun" (Daesung)
 "Doom Dada" (T.O.P)
 "Eyes, Nose, Lips" (Taeyang)
 "Crooked" (G-Dragon)
 "Good Boy" (GD X TAEYANG)
 "Sober"
Encore
  "Bae Bae"
 "We Like 2 Party"
 "Fantastic Baby"

Dates

Cancelled dates

Box office score data

References

External links
 Big Bang Weibo
 YG Entertainment

2016 concert tours
BigBang (South Korean band) concert tours